40th Brigade may refer to:

 40th Naval Infantry Brigade, a unit of the Russian Navy
 40th Infantry Brigade Combat Team (United States), a unit of the United States Army
 40th Tactical Aviation Brigade, an aviation unit of the Ukrainian Air Force
 United Kingdom
 40th Anti-Aircraft Brigade (United Kingdom)
 40th Brigade (United Kingdom)
 Artillery Brigades
 40th Brigade Royal Field Artillery

See also
 40th Division (disambiguation)
 40th Regiment (disambiguation)
 40th Battalion (disambiguation)
 40th Squadron (disambiguation)